The 1991 IIHF European Women Championships was held March 15 – March 23, 1991, in Czechoslovakia. Finland skated to their 2nd consecutive tournament with a 2–1 victory of Sweden in the final, after trailing 1–0 at the end of the 2nd Period.

Denmark picked up the bronze medal with a victory over Norway in the 3rd place game. The tournament holds the record for the most teams competing in a single IIHF Women's tournament (10) and most games played at the tournament (25).

Teams & Format

Ten teams entered the championship. All of the teams were entered into the final tournament without any qualification. These were:

The teams were divided into two groups of five teams. Each team played each other once within the group. The teams then played a play-off game against the team with the same position in the opposing group, i.e. the Group Winners played off for Gold and Silver, 2nd place in each group, for Bronze and 4th place etc.

First round

Group A

Standings

Results
All times local (GMT+4)

Group B

Standings

Results
All times local (GMT+4)

Playoff round

Consolation round 9–10 place

Consolation round 7–8 place

Consolation round 5–6 place

Match for third place

Final

Champions

Final standings

See also
IIHF European Women Championships

External links
 Hockey Archives - Championnats d'Europe féminins 1991 

IIHF European Women Championships
Euro
1991
women
1991 in Czechoslovak women's sport
Sport in Frýdek-Místek
IIHF European Women Championships